The Chugach School District is a school district headquartered in Anchorage, Alaska. It operates three brick-and-mortar schools in Prince William Sound, Alaska; a homeschool program that serves students across the state; and a short-term residential school out of Anchorage.

Schools
Chenega Bay
Chenega Bay Community School is located in the Southwest region of Prince William Sound, on Evan's Island. It is part of the Alaska Native Village of Chenega Bay. This school is the smallest in the Chugach School District, with 15 students enrolled for the 2020-2021 school year.
Tatitlek
Tatitlek Community School is located in the Northeast region of Prince William Sound, in the 90-person community of the Alaska Native Village of Tatitlek. This school has about 19 students enrolled for the 2020-2021 school year.
Whittier
Whittier Community School is located in Northwestern Prince William Sound, in the 280-person community of Whittier. This is the largest of Chugach's brick-and-mortar schools, with about 55 students enrolled for the 2020-2021 school year.
FOCUS Homeschool
Chugach's homeschool program, FOCUS Homeschool, has main offices in Anchorage, Fairbanks, and Valdez that serve families across the state. The majority of Chugach's students are part of the homeschool program. There were approximately 608 students enrolled in FOCUS Homeschool for the 2020-2021 school year.

Voyage to Excellence
The Voyage to Excellence (VTE) Program is a residential school that provides students with opportunities to apply what they have learned in school to real life situations. There are phases of varying lengths, from 6 days to a month, that have specific focuses. During these phases, students gain skills and training in various life skills, personal development, social development, service training, urban/city life familiarization, leadership, and career development. The mission of VTE is to provide youth with the skills  and knowledge necessary to make a successful transition from school to life, which they accomplish through over 70 partnerships with schools and businesses.

History
The Chugach School District underwent major changes starting in 1994. They went from the bottom quartile in Alaska to, just five years after rebuilding their education system, the top quartile. This began with two years of input-gathering from communities and businesses.

Performance-Based Education
Chugach is recognized as being one of the longest-running, public performance-based school districts. This model is described as a "reversal" of the traditional education equation. Instead of time being the constant and learning being the variable, as in the traditional system, learning is the constant and time is the variable.

Awards
In 2001, the Chugach School District became the first educational institution to earn the prestigious Malcolm Baldrige National Quality Award offered by the National Institute of Standards and Technology (NIST).

In 2008, Chugach School District won the Alaska Performance Excellence (APEX) award of quality.

In 2021, Chugach School District’s Fairbanks based agricultural education program, Silent Springs FFA, was recognized as 3-Star premier chapter as well as a top 10 National finalist by the National FFA Organization.

External links
Chugach School District official page. On Facebook
FOCUS Homeschool official page. On Facebook
Voyage to Excellence Program official page. On Facebook
Chenega Bay Community School official page. On Facebook
Tatitlek Community School official page. On Facebook
Whittier Community School official page. On Facebook

References

Chugach Census Area, Alaska
Education in Anchorage, Alaska
Education in Unorganized Borough, Alaska
School districts in Alaska